Sullivan Bay lies  due south of Melbourne on Port Phillip,  east of Sorrento, Victoria. It was established as a short-lived convict settlement in 1803 by Lieutenant-Colonel David Collins, who named the bay after the Under-Secretary of State for War and the Colonies, John Sullivan.

The site was chosen because of its strategic location near the entrance of Port Phillip Bay. The settlement is significant because it was the first attempt to settle Europeans permanently in what is now Victoria and was a key link in the expansion of the colony of New South Wales into Tasmania and Victoria, and the control of Bass Strait as a trade route.

History
In 1802, Lieutenant John Murray discovered Port Phillip Bay and claimed it for the British Crown, and Matthew Flinders further explored the area that same year. The British government was impressed with their positive reports, and were also worried that the French might try to establish colonies there.

They decided to get in first. In April 1803  and the transport ship Ocean sailed from England, via the Cape of Good Hope, carrying officers, a marine detachment, free settlers, and 301 convicts to Port Phillip, and some wives and children. They arrived on 10 October 1803.

Shortly after arriving, a party led by James Tuckey was dispatched to explore Port Phillip Bay. They reported that the land was poor and there was little fresh water even though the Yarra and Marybyrnong Rivers had been discovered on 2 January 1803 by Charles Grimes' party,  months before the arrival of the Sullivans Bay colonists. They also reported that suitable timber could not be found. The treacherous entrance to the bay made the site unsuitable for whaling and with few marines, the settlement was vulnerable to attack.

Collins asked Governor King for permission to abandon the site, and was eventually given permission to do so. On 30 January 1804, Collins and some of the convicts left in Ocean and Lady Nelson for Van Diemens Land (now Tasmania,) where John Bowen had established a settlement at Risdon Cove in 1803. They were moved as two parties, the second leaving on 20 May, just over seven months after the settlement was established. Records show 30 people died at the settlement.

During the brief occupation, 21 convicts escaped.  One of these was William Buckley who lived in the area around Geelong for 33 years before meeting with John Batman's party in 1835.

Little evidence of the settlement remains. Four graves on the eastern headland, and parts of barrels, leg irons, bottles and other pieces are all that exist.

References

Further reading
Marjorie Tipping. Convicts unbound : the story of the Calcutta convicts and their settlement in Australia South Yarra, Vic. Viking O'Neil, 1988
Crook, William Pascoe, (1983), An Account of the Settlement at Sullivan Bay, Port Phillip 1803,(ed John Currey) The Colony Press, Melbourne.
Bonwick, James, (1883), Port Phillip Settlement, Samson, Low, Marston, Searle & Rivington Publishing, London.
Angell, B, (1984), Voyage to Port Phillip 1803, Neapean Historical Society, Sorrento.
Cotter, Richard (2001) No place for a colony: Sullivan Bay, Sorrento & the Collins Settlement.
Coutts, J. F. (1981) Victoria's first official settlement: Sullivan Bay, Port Phillip. Victoria Archaeological Survey, Ministry for Conservation.

Port Phillip
History of Victoria (Australia)
1803 establishments in Australia